The Biathlon World Championships 2020 took place in Rasen-Antholz, Italy, from 12 to 23 February 2020.

Host selection
On 4 September 2016, Antholz-Anterselva won the voting (30 votes) during the twelfth IBU Congress in Chișinău over Pokljuka (15 votes) and Oberhof, Germany (four votes). Also Nové Město na Moravě withdrew their bid for 2020 before the vote took place. The 2020 event is staged in Antholz for the sixth time.

Schedule
All times are local (UTC+1).

Medal summary

Medal table

Top athletes
All athletes with two or more medals.

Men

Women

Mixed

References

External links

 
2020
2020 in biathlon
2020 in Italian sport
International sports competitions hosted by Italy
Sport in South Tyrol
Biathlon competitions in Italy
February 2020 sports events in Italy